The Estadio Sonora is a baseball stadium located in Hermosillo, Sonora, Mexico.  It is home to the Naranjeros de Hermosillo (Hermosillo Orange Pickers) of the Mexican Pacific League.

The Estadio Sonora opened in 2013 and replaced the Estadio Héctor Espino as the home of the Naranjeros. It also hosted the 2013 Caribbean Series.

References

Baseball venues in Mexico
Hermosillo
Sports venues in Sonora